Visaginas is the centre of Lithuania's youngest municipality, located on the north-eastern edge of the country. It was built as a town for workers engaged in the construction of the Ignalina Nuclear Power Plant. Visaginas is the only town in Lithuania where the majority of population speaks Russian as the first language. Originally the aerial view of Visaginas was designed to resemble a butterfly.  However, after work on the nuclear power plant was cancelled, so was further construction of the town. Currently Visaginas consists of three residential regions that locals refer to as the 1st, 2nd and 3rd Microdistricts. Visaginas has 14 streets. The city grew up in a pine forest by Lake Visaginas. Tourism is currently an area of great potential, as is the possibility of a new nuclear power plant.

The administrative centre of Visaginas municipality is situated near the country's biggest lake, Drūkšiai. Its administrative boundaries are in the process of being defined. The Vilnius–Daugavpils railway runs alongside the town, providing convenient communication with those cities. Motorways connect the town with all other cities in the republic.

History

In the distant past, the surroundings of Visaginas were inhabited by the Selonians. Historical annals first mention the location in 1526, when it was presented by the nobleman Vaitiekus Goštautas to the Naujasis (New) Daugėliškis parish. In the 14th–19th centuries the region was invaded by the Livonian, Swedish, Russian and French troops.

Before World War II, from 1922 to 1939, the area of modern Visaginas lay within the boundaries of the Gmina Smołwy in the Brasław County of the Wilno Voivodeship in Poland.

The settlement was founded in 1975 as Sniečkus, a town for workers at the Ignalina Nuclear Power Plant on the shores of Lake Visaginas. It was established in place of four villages that were demolished, the largest of which was known as Visaginas. The new town was named after Antanas Sniečkus, a former first secretary of the Lithuanian Communist Party, and was granted the status of an urban-type settlement. Following the restoration of independence, the city was renamed to Visaginas in 1992 and received municipal rights in 1995. It is governed by a town council, which elects the mayor. In 1996, the city's coat of arms was confirmed by a decree of the President of Lithuania.

The settlement was developed in complexes, with construction designed to create an infrastructure for the cultural and everyday life of the residents. Efforts were made to preserve the natural surroundings as much as possible.

Population
In 1996, the population was 33,100, of which 55.68% were Russians, 15.88% Lithuanians, 10.29% Belarusians, 9.13% Poles, 5.69% Ukrainians and 0.95% Tatars. Orthodox Christians made up 40.42% of the total population, Roman Catholics 27.29%, the Non-affiliated 27.29%, Old Believers 2.89% and Muslims 0.46%. In 2001, the population was 52.43% Russian, 14.96% Lithuanian and 32.61% other. In 2011, the population was 22,361. Russians accounted for 52.16% (11,664) of the inhabitants, Lithuanians - 18.27% (4,086), Belarusians - 9.89% (2,211), Poles -  9.32% (2,084), and Ukrainians - 5.16% (1,154). In 2021, the population was 19,633. Russians accounted for 47.36% (9,299) of the inhabitants, Lithuanians - 20.13% (3,953), Belarusians - 9.60% (1,884), Poles -  10.23% (2,009), and Ukrainians - 5.23% (1,027). This creates a distinctive cultural ambiance in the town.

Industry

Power was the main branch of industry: the country's only nuclear power plant, one of the world's most powerful, is situated near Visaginas. It ceased operations in December 2009 over safety concerns and is currently being decommissioned. Over 5,000 people were employed in the plant. There are opportunities to developing the construction industry in order to utilize the existing industrial potential (concrete, ferroconcrete, and wood), and also the electronics industry, polish and paint, and clothing. There are over 1,500 companies in the town active in light industry, trade and services.

Education, culture, and sports
The town has a polytechnic school, six secondary schools, an elementary school, eight nursery schools, music and acrobatics colleges, a sports centre and other institutions engaged in organizing educational and leisure activities, including 11 sports clubs with more than 1,600 members. Professional training is available in soccer, Greco-Roman wrestling, and skiing. An annual country music festival "Visaginas Country" is held 
in the town.

Twin towns – sister cities

Visaginas is twinned with:
 Dagda, Latvia
 Daugavpils, Latvia
 Lidzbark Warmiński, Poland
 Slavutych, Ukraine
 Zambrów, Poland

References

External links

Official website
Contemporary Photo essay of the city
Visagino dienraštis "Visaginietis"

 
Visaginas Municipality
Cities in Utena County
Cities in Lithuania
Cities and towns built in the Soviet Union
Populated places established in 1975
Municipalities administrative centres of Lithuania
Russian communities